James, Jimmy or Jim Kelly may refer to:

Crime and law
James Kelly (pirate) (died 1701), English pirate
James Kelly (crimper), 19th-century American criminal
James McGirr Kelly (1928–2005), U.S. federal judge
James Kelly (Irish Army officer) (1929–2003), cleared of attempting to import arms for the IRA in 1970
James Kelly (murderer) (1860–1929), English murderer and Jack the Ripper suspect
Jimmy Kelly (saloon keeper) (fl. 1900–1914), organizer and underworld figure in New York

Entertainment
James E. Kelly (artist) (1855–1933), American sculptor and illustrator
James F. Kelly, American actor
James Kelly (artist) (1913–2003), American painter
James Martin Kelly (born 1954), American actor and writer
James Patrick Kelly (born 1951), American writer
James Paul Kelly (1911-1972), American politician and Missouri state senator
Jim Kelly (martial artist) (1946–2013), karate champion and martial arts film star
Jim Kelly (author) (born 1957), British crime writer and journalist
Jimmy Kelly (singer) (born 1971), Irish-American singer and musician
James Kelly, member of Irish metal group Altar of Plagues
James D. Kelly, photographer and portrait artist from UK
James Kelly (fiddler) (born 1957), Irish fiddler, member of folk group Patrick Street

Politics

United States
James Kelly (U.S. representative) (1760–1819), for the Federalist Party, Pennsylvania, 1805–1809
James K. Kelly (1819–1903), U.S. senator for Oregon (1871–1877)
James C. Kelly (1857-1947), American politician and farmer from Minnesota
James W. Kelly Jr. (1908–1990), mayor of East Orange, New Jersey
James H. Kelly (1919–1984), American politician
James A. Kelly Jr. (1926–2013), member of Massachusetts House of Representatives and Senate
James A. Kelly (born 1936), Assistant U.S. Secretary of State for East Asian and Pacific Affairs, 2001–2005
James B. Kelly III (born 1941), Pennsylvania politician
James M. Kelly (Boston politician) (1940–2007), Boston City Council member
Jim Kelly (Kansas politician) (born 1947), member of the Kansas House of Representatives
James M. Kelly (Maryland politician) (born 1960)

Elsewhere
James Whyte Kelly (1855–1938), New Zealand politician
James Kelly (Fianna Fáil politician), Irish Fianna Fáil politician
James Kelly (Repeal Association politician) (1808–1875), Irish Repeal Association politician
James Kelly (Scottish politician) (born 1963), member of the Scottish Parliament
James Kelly, MP for the Irish constituency of Limerick City, 1844–1847

Sports

Association football
James Kelly (footballer, born 1865) (1865–1932), Scottish football player (Renton FC, Celtic FC, national team) and administrator
James Kelly (Lincoln City footballer) (fl. 1892–93), Scottish footballer (Lincoln City FC)
James Kelly (soccer) (c. 1920s), U.S. soccer player
Jimmy Kelly (footballer, born 1907) (1907–1984), English professional footballer
Jimmy Kelly (footballer, born 1911) (1911–1970), Irish international footballer
Jimmy Kelly (footballer, born 1931) (1931–2003), English footballer active in the 1950s and 1960s
Jimmy Kelly (footballer, born 1933), Scottish footballer active in the 1950s
Jimmy Kelly (footballer, born 1954), Northern Irish footballer active in England and North America in the 1970s and 1980s
Jimmy Kelly (footballer, born 1957), English footballer for Manchester United and NASL teams
Jimmy Kelly (footballer, born 1973), English footballer for Wrexham and Wolverhampton Wanderers
Jimmy Kelly (Northern Ireland footballer) (fl. 1920s), Northern Irish footballer

American football
Jim Kelly (born 1960), American football Hall of Fame quarterback 
Jimmy Kelly (American football), NFL player
Jim Kelly (tight end, born 1942), American football player
Jim Kelly (tight end, born 1951), American football player

Other sports
Jim Kelly (baseball) (1884–1961), American
Jimmy Kelly (hurler) (1884–1966), Irish hurler
Jimmy Kelly (Carrickshock hurler) (1916–1985), Irish hurler
Jim Kelly (coach) (1893–1972), American basketball, football, and track and field coach
Jim Kelly (Australian cricketer) (1867–1938), wicket-keeper
Jim Kelly (New Zealand cricketer) (1928–1995), Wellington representative cricketer in 1951
Jim Kelly (boxer) (1912–?), Northern Irish boxer of the 1920s, '30s and '40s
Jimmy Kelly (boxer, born 1992), Irish boxer
Jim Kelly (martial artist) (1946–2013), karate champion and martial arts film star
James Kelly (Australian footballer) (born 1983), Australian rules footballer
Jim Kelly (sportscaster), American sportscaster
James Kelly (basketball) (born 1993), American basketball player

Other
James Kelly (Australian explorer) (1791–1859), Australian mariner and explorer
James Kelly (journalist) (1809–1895), founder of Chicago Tribune
James Kelly (bishop) (1832–1907), Anglican bishop of Newfoundland and Scotland
James Kelly (priest) (1877–1939), New Zealand Catholic priest and editor
James W. Kelly (1913–1989), U.S. Navy admiral
James Kelly (historian) (born 1959), professor of Irish history
James M. Kelly (astronaut) (born 1964), NASA astronaut on Space Shuttle missions
James Graves Kelly (1843–1923), officer in the British Indian Army
James Gordon Kelly, professor of psychology
James Johnson Kelly (1928–2018), Tuskegee Airman
James P. Kelly, CEO of United Parcel Service, 1997–2001
Jim Kelly, managing editor of Time magazine (2001–2005)

See also
James Kelley (disambiguation)
James Edward Kelly (disambiguation)
James Fitzmaurice-Kelly (1858–1923), British writer on Spanish literature
Jim Kelly Peak, a mountain in British Columbia, Canada